Charlotte Guillard (died 1557) was the first woman printer of importance.  Guillard worked at the famous Soleil d'Or  printing house from 1502 until her death. Annie Parent described her as a "notability of the Rue Saint-Jacques", the street where the shop was located in Paris, France. She became one of the most important printers of the Latin Quarter area in the city of Paris. As a woman, she was officially active with her own imprint during her two widowhood periods, that is to say in 1519–20, and in 1537–57. While she was not the first woman printer, succeeding both Anna Rugerin of Augsburg (1484) and Anna Fabri of Stockholm (1496), she was the first woman printer with a significantly known career.

Biography

Early life

Guillard was very likely born in the late 1480s in Saint-Calais, France. Her name is sometime spelled Guillart and in Latin books as Carola Guillard. Living in the province of Maine in France, her parents were Jacques Guillard and Guillemyne Savary. The professions of her parents are unknown, but her known relatives are mostly merchants or lawyers. Guillard had at least three and possibly four sisters and one brother.

First mariage

Guillard showed interest in the printing business as early as 1500. Guillard first married Berthold Rembolt about 1507 (and not 1502 as it has wrongly been assumed). Her first husband worked with the earliest French printer Ulrich Gering. Their printing business specialised in law and theology.

Rembolt died in 1519. Paris businesses and crafts in the sixteenth century were regulated by the guild system.

Second career

In 1520 Guillard married Claude Chevallon, a bookseller who also printed theological books. From this time forward, Guillard was known as "la Chevallonne". She was widowed a second time in 1537.

Thereafter, Guillard ran her printing business on her own. Normally women were not allowed to own a business, however they were allowed  to take over the business of their husband after their death.

The publishing house was led by Guillard, with the help of her correctors : Jean Hucher (until 1538), Jacques Bogard (1538-1541), Louis Miré (1541-1552) and then Guillaume Guillard. She helped her nephew Pierre Haultin to establish as a printer and a punchcutter.

Guillard's works were recognized for their beauty and accuracy. In fact she built up such a good reputation of accuracy that she was commissioned by Luigi Lippomano, bishop of Verona to publish his works. She was often associated with Guillaume des Boys, her nephew-in-law.

Her business was significant: she owned five or six printing presses with about 25-30 employees and published about  200 editions. She catered to students, professional or religious clientele, often printed anti-Protestant books, and offered books in Latin as well as Greek.

She probably died in 1557.

More than 400 different libraries worldwide have books printed by Guillard.

Selected works
 The works of the Fathers
 Jacques Toussain (Jacobus Tusanus), Lexicon Graecolatinum (1552)
 Louis Lassere, La Vie de Monseigneur Sainct Hierosme (1541) (previously printed by Josse Badius ca. 1529)
 List of works printed by Charlotte Guillard (on Copac)
Alexandri ab Alexandro iurisperiti Neapolitani genialium dierum libri sex, varia ac recondita eruditione referti (Paris: Carolam Guillard, 1539), from the Lisa Unger Baskin Collection at Duke University.

See also
 List of women printers and publishers before 1800

Notes

Bibliography
 Beatrice Beech, "Charlotte Guillard: a sixteenth-century business woman," in: Renaissance Quarterly; No. 36, 3 (Autumn 1983:345-367)
 Rémi Jimenes, "Passeurs d'atelier . La transmission d'une librairie à Paris au XVIe siècle : le cas du Soleil d'Or", Gens du livre et gens de lettres à la Renaissance, Turnhout, Brepols, 2014, p. 309-322.
 Rémi Jimenes, Charlotte Guillard. Une femme imprimeur de la Renaissance, Tours, PUFR, 2017.
Nelson, Naomi L., Lauren Reno, and Lisa Unger Baskin [eds.]. Five Hundred Years of Women's Work: The Lisa Unger Baskin Collection New York and Durham, NC: The Grolier Club and Duke University, 2019, forthcoming via Oak Knoll Books.

1557 deaths
French printers
French publishers (people)
Year of birth unknown
16th-century French businesswomen
16th-century printers
16th-century publishers (people)
Women printers